Wilwal International Airport  (also known as Garaad Wiil-Waal Airport) is an airport serving Jijiga, the capital city of the Somali Region in Ethiopia. It is named after nineteenth-century jigjiga ruler Garad Wiil-Waal.

History 
The first airfield at Jijiga was constructed in 1929. An airplane crash at Jijiga in July 1930 involved the eighth or ninth aircraft introduced to Ethiopia; it was the second airplane disaster in the country. The plane was a Fiat AS-1 with 85 hp engine, a training airplane bought in 1929. The first tests in air pilot training in Ethiopia were passed at the Garad Wiil-Waal Airport by Mishka Babitcheff and Asfaw Ali on 1 and 4 September 1930.

By the 1990s, the Garad Wiil-Waal Airport was one of 10 bases of the Ethiopian Air Force.

Facilities 

Airlines and destinations

References

External links 

 

Airports in Ethiopia
Somali Region